Enzo Adrián Ruíz (born 20 June 1989) is an Argentine footballer who plays for Maltese side Birkirkara.

Honours

Player
Boca Juniors
 Argentine Primera División (1): 2011 Apertura
 Copa Argentina (1): 2011–12

Unión Española
 Primera División de Chile (1): 2013 Transición

References

External links
 

1989 births
Living people
Argentine footballers
Argentine expatriate footballers
Boca Juniors footballers
Unión Española footballers
Argentine Primera División players
Chilean Primera División players
Expatriate footballers in Chile
Floriana F.C. players
Association football defenders
Footballers from Rosario, Santa Fe